John Mitchell Kemble (2 April 1807 – 26 March 1857), English scholar and historian, was the eldest son of Charles Kemble the actor and Maria Theresa Kemble. He is known for his major contribution to the history of the Anglo-Saxons and philology of the Old English language, including one of the first translations of Beowulf.

Education 
Kemble received his education from Charles Richardson and at Bury St Edmunds grammar school, where he obtained in 1826 an exhibition to Trinity College, Cambridge, where he became a member of the Cambridge Apostles. As a law student, his historical essays were well received but he "would not follow the course of study prescribed by the university and was, moreover, fond of society and of athletic amusements", which caused the deferral of his graduation in 1829. His Bachelor of Arts degree was granted in March 1830, and his M.A. degree three years later in March 1833.

Anglo-Saxon studies 
Kemble concentrated on Anglo-Saxon England, through the influence of Jacob Grimm, under whom he studied at Göttingen (1831). He published Anglo-Saxon Poems of Beowulf (1833–1837), Über die Stammtafeln der Westsachsen (Munich 1836), Codex diplomaticus aevi Saxonici (London 1839–1848), and made many contributions to reviews; his History of the Saxons in England (1849; new ed. 1876) was based on original sources for the early period of English history.

Kemble's "literal" Beowulf translation was entirely in prose.

 * The prose does not attempt to follow the original's order in words or phrases.
}}

He was editor of the British and Foreign Review from 1835 to 1844; and from 1840 to his death was Examiner of Plays. In 1857 he published State Papers and Correspondence Illustrative of the Social and Political State of Europe from the Revolution to the Accession of the House of Hanover.

His Horae Ferales, or Studies in the Archaeology of Northern Nations was completed by Robert Gordon Latham, and published in 1864.

Marriage and death 
Kemble married Nathalie Auguste, daughter of Amadeus Wendt of the University of Göttingen, in about 1836. They had two daughters and a son, but the marriage was not a happy one and they were living apart by about 1850. The elder daughter, Gertrude (b. 1837) married Sir Charles Santley, the singer, and died in 1882.

Kemble died at Dublin on 26 March 1857 and is buried there in Mount Jerome Cemetery.

See also 
 Walter de Gray Birch

References

External links 
 
 Kemble J. M. The Saxons in England, Vol. 1 1848 edn., at the Internet Archive
 Kemble J. M. The Saxons in England, Vol. 2 1848 edn., at the Internet Archive
 Kemble J. M., Birch W. de G. (ed.) The Saxons in England, Vol. 1 1876 edn., at the Internet Archive
 Kemble J. M., Birch W. de G. (ed.) The Saxons in England, Vol. 2 1876 edn., at the Internet Archive
 Works by John Mitchell Kemble in the Berlin State Library
 John Mitchell Kemble Collection at Goucher College
 Kemble at Anglo-Saxon Charters website
 

Translators from Old English
1807 births
1857 deaths
Anglo-Saxon studies scholars
Burials at Mount Jerome Cemetery and Crematorium
Alumni of Trinity College, Cambridge
19th-century English people
19th-century translators
Kemble family